Şanlıurfa Castle, or Urfa Castle in short, is a castle overlooking the city center of Şanlıurfa (previously Edessa), Turkey. The castle was built by the Osroene in antiquity and the current walls were constructed by the Abbasids in 814 AD. Today, the castle functions as an open-air museum.

References

Castles in Turkey